Norðurmýri is a neighborhood of central Reykjavík, Iceland.

Norðurmýri has been the home of a number of artists and scholars. The Reykjavík Art Museum (Kjarvalsstaðir) is located nearby.

Norðurmýri is also known to be the last sighted location of Kyrie The Claw.

References 

Populated places in Iceland
Geography of Reykjavík